The 2016–17 season is the Dynamos 20th season of operation.
They are once again competing in the NIHL South Division 1
To commemorate their 20th year of existence, the team are using a special logo for the duration of the season.

Previous season's captain, Nicky Lewis, although still with the club, has not continued in his leadership role.
Callum Fowler has taken the C and will lead the team for the 2016/17 campaign.

Roster moves

In
23 April 2016 – (R-S) The 2015/16 season is barely over when NM Damien King signs for a second season in Gillingham.
24 April 2016 – (R-S) Just 1 day after King signs for 2016/17, import defenceman, Ondrej Zosiak is confirmed as extending his stay in Medway.
07 May 2016 – (R-S) Ever-present in 2015/16, defenceman Arran Strawson makes it 5 straight seasons with Invicta.
11 May 2016 – (N P) The first new face for 2016/17 comes in the shape of 21-year-old forward, Mason Webster from London Raiders.
13 May 2016 – (R-S) Ever-present in 2015/16, 200 game defenceman Harrison Lillis stays for another season, hoping to improve even further on 2015/16.
18 May 2016 – (R-S) Joshua Condren, who scored 12 goals in 49 appearances during 2015/16, returns for his second season in Gillingham.
20 May 2016 – (R-S) Ever-present in 2015/16, Elliott Dewey makes it 3 seasons in a row with Invicta.
09 June 2016 – (R-S) Bailey Wootton returns for his second senior season in Gillingham, having spent the majority of his junior career with the club.
10 June 2016 – (R-S) Having scored a total of 38 points (14+24) in 49 games during 2015/16 and quickly becoming a fan-favourite, Conor Redmond signs for his second season in Gillingham.
15 June 2016 – (R-S) Ever-present in 2015/16, former Dynamo junior, Jarvis Mewett returns for his second senior season.
17 June 2016 – (R-S) NIHL South Division 1's top points scorer in 2015/16, Steve Osman returns for another season in Medway.
23 June 2016 – (R-S) A player who has seen many others come and go, last season's captain, Nicky Lewis returns for his eighth year as a Dynamo.
24 June 2016 – (R-S) Callum Fowler returns for another season in Gillingham. This year, the club's third highest scorer of all-time (516 points in total), takes the captaincy.
30 June 2016 – (R-S) Scoring his first-ever goal for the Dynamos in 2015/16 and finishing with 5 points (2+3), Brad Gutridge returns for his third straight season in NIHL 1.
06 July 2016 – (R-S) Haydn Wootton, having split his time between NIHL 1 and Guildford junior sides, committed to full-time senior hockey with Invicta for 2016/17.
06 July 2016 – (R-S) Taylor Wootton joins his twin brother in switching from a two-way deal with Guildford juniors, to full-time senior hockey in Gillingham.
08 July 2016 – (N S) 22-year-old defenceman, Tommy Ralph, who has Elite League and EPL experience, joins the Dynamos for 2016/17.
16 August 2016 – (N S) The Invicta Dynamos announce the arrival of 23-year-old Czech winger, Adam Rehak, who iced 16 times in the WHL, for the 2016/17 season.
19 August 2016 – (N S) 27-year-old Anthony Baskerville, having impressed head coach Kevin Parrish during the last 2 season, steps up from Invicta Mustangs.
26 August 2016 – (N S) 23-year-old netminder, James Richardson arrives in Kent to deputise for Damien King.
29 August 2016 – (N S) Team GB's Olympic Field Hockey star and all-time leading scorer, Ashley Jackson signs, having previously iced for 8 games in 2014/15 season.

Out

Players for 2016/17 season including stats
As of 29 August 2016

Fixtures and results

Pre-Season Challenge Matches

NIHL South Division 1

NIHL Southern Cup

Semi-final

Final

References

External links
Official website

Invicta Dynamos seasons
invicta